Argyra diaphana is a species of fly in the family Dolichopodidae. It is distributed in Europe, except for the south.

References

External links
Ecology of Commanster

Diaphorinae
Insects described in 1775
Diptera of Europe
Taxa named by Johan Christian Fabricius